Henry Pylkowski, known in his boxing career as Babe Risko, and Eddie Risko,  (July 14, 1911 – March 8, 1957) was a Lithuanian-Polish-American boxer who became Middleweight boxing champion of the world in portions of 1935–36.  While boxing in his early career with the US Navy, he was known as Sailor Puleski.  He was managed by Gabe Genovese of Syracuse, New York.  After winning the World Middleweight Title, his professional career declined rapidly, perhaps because of his lengthy amateur career with the Navy.

Early life and amateur career
Risko was born Henry Pylkowski on July 14, 1911 in Syracuse, New York, the son of a struggling Lithuanian family of five.  He attended school in Syracuse.  He had a long and impressive amateur boxing career in the United States Navy, which he joined at only 16 in 1927, and fought around 125 matches as Sailor Puleski. Risko won the Navy Middleweight Title in a Panama Bullring in 1931, and was undefeated in his fights with the Navy.

Professional boxing career

Risko's rapid rise in the boxing world
On New Years Day 1935, bursting on the world scene in a stunning upset, Risko defeated defending World Middleweight Champion Teddy Yarosz in a technical knockout, though the bout was not for the title.  Yarosz was down five times before his manager ended the bout early in the seventh round.  A crowd of only 2300 witnessed the bout that demonstrated Risko's mastery of the reigning champion.

On January 25, 1935, Risko met the great Vince Dundee, losing in a fifteen round split decision at New York's Madison Square Garden.  Due to an error by one of the two judges, Risko was first announced as the winner, but the mistake was soon corrected by boxing commissioners present at the fight.  Though Risko's closing rounds were strong and demonstrated his youthful endurance, Dundee's consistent aggressiveness and body punching convinced judges to vote in his favor. The Associated Press gave six rounds to Dundee and four to Risko.

Taking the World Middleweight Championship

Risko won the NYSAC World Middleweight Title and National Boxing Association World Middleweight Title with a win over Teddy Yarosz on September 19, 1935. Risko knocked Yarosz to the mat twice for counts of nine in the sixth and seventh rounds, and several judges gave Yarosz only the first round. On December 21, 1935 Risko was knocked out in the first round by Jock McAvoy after being floored six times. The match was a non-title bout, with both men weighing in over the 160 pound middleweight limit.

On February 10, 1936, Risko successfully defended his World Middleweight championship for the only time against Tony Fisher in ten rounds in Newark, New Jersey.  Risko was awarded eight of the ten rounds in a title bout considered "drab" by some reporters.  Only one round was awarded to Fisher, a 21 year old Newark native.

Losing the World Middleweight Championship
Risko lost the belt on July 11,1936 to Freddie Steele via a fifteen round unanimous decision in Seattle, Washington before an impressive crowd of 25,000. Steele scored the only knockdown in the bout when he put Risko to the mat with a right to the jaw for a count of six in the first round. Steele damaged both of Risko's eyes during the bout which hampered the reigning champions ability to defend himself. The Associated Press gave Risko only three rounds of the well attended bout.

On February 19, 1937 Risko attempted another shot at the title against Steele at Madison Square Garden but lost in a fifteen around unanimous decision.  The Associated Press gave Steele nine rounds, with five to Risko, and one even.  The bout, fought before a crowd of 11,600, was described as tedious by many reporters.

Retirement and life after boxing
Risko married Sally Ciborowski of Syracuse in 1936 and eventually had a daughter.

After losing five straight fights by knockout, Risko retired from boxing in 1939, only three years after holding the crown.  He recruited for the Navy during WWII and served as Deputy Sheriff in Onondaga County.  He later worked as a sales manager for the U. 
S. Hoffman Machinery Corp. of New York.  On March 7, 1957, he died unexpectedly in his sleep in his home in Syracuse at age 46.  He was still working for the machinery firm at the time of his death.

Professional boxing record

Boxing achievements

References

External links
 
Babe Risko's obituary
Pasaulio čempiono šaknys - Lietuvoje >> Sportas.info - Lietuvos sporto veidrodis
Lietuviški kumščiai, verti čempionų diržų

1911 births
1957 deaths
Boxers from New York (state)
Middleweight boxers
World middleweight boxing champions
World boxing champions
Sportspeople from Syracuse, New York
American people of Polish descent
American male boxers